Oungre is a hamlet in the Canadian province of Saskatchewan. It is in the RM of Souris Valley No. 7.

Demographics 

See also 
 List of communities in Saskatchewan
 List of hamlets in Saskatchewan
 Oungre Memorial Regional Park
 Block settlement§Jewish

References 

Designated places in Saskatchewan
Hamlets in Saskatchewan
Souris Valley No. 7, Saskatchewan
Division No. 2, Saskatchewan